Barclay Mowlem was an Australian construction company that traded from 1957 until 2006.

History
In 1957, Barclay Bros was founded in Brisbane by Don and Ian Barclay, growing to become one of the largest construction companies in Queensland. In 1958 it expanded into Papua New Guinea when it was awarded a contract to build a new hospital in Madang. In 1971 John Mowlem purchased a 40% shareholding, later taking 100% ownership. It expanded into all other Australian mainland states except South Australia and into Asia.

In 1985, Barclay Bros merged with Roberts Construction, making it one of the top five Australian construction companies. In 1988 it was rebranded Barclay Mowlem.

In December 2005, Barclay Mowlem was included in the purchase of Mowlem by Carillion. With no other Australian operations, Carillion put the business up for sale, with Laing O'Rourke purchasing it in July 2006 and retiring the brand.

Notable projects
Notable projects completed by Barclay Mowlem included:
Houghton Highway Bridge, completed in 1979
Queensland Performing Arts Centre, completed in 1985
Brisbane Airport domestic terminal, completed in 1987
111 George Street, completed in 1993
Woronora River Bridge, completed in 2001
Alice Springs to Darwin railway as part of a consortium with John Holland, Kellogg Brown & Root and Macmahon, completed in 2004
Joondalup railway line extension from Currambine to Clarkson, completed in 2004
Sea Cliff Bridge, completed in 2005
Taiwan High Speed Rail depot and track laying as part of a consortium with Fu Tsu Construction, Heitkamp Rail, Hsin Lung Construction and Leighton Asia, completed in 2005
Thornlie railway station, completed in 2005 

At the time of its sale to Laing O'Rourke, Barclay Mowlem was involved in the construction of the Chatswood Transport Interchange and Fortescue railway.

References

Companies based in Brisbane
Construction and civil engineering companies established in 1957
Construction and civil engineering companies of Australia
1957 establishments in Australia
2006 establishments in Australia